Ryavallen is a multi-purpose stadium in Borås, Sweden, mainly used for soccer and track and field athletics. It was inaugurated on 17 August 1941 with a soccer game where IF Elfsborg defeated Team Sweden, 2–1.

It was the home ground for IF Elfsborg until 2005, when the Borås Arena was Inaugurated. During the 1958 FIFA World Cup, it hosted the matches between USSR and Austria, and between England and Austria.

The record attendance is 22,654 spectators, when IF Elfsborg played IFK Norrköping in 1961. After Elfsborg had left the arena, the north stand was replaced by an indoor athletics hall. Ryavallen is currently used mostly for athletics. 

As of today (June 2016), Ryavallen has a seating capacity of circa 12 000 spectators.

Image gallery

References

External links

Football venues in Sweden
1958 FIFA World Cup stadiums
Multi-purpose stadiums in Sweden
IF Elfsborg
Sports venues in Borås
Sports venues completed in 1941
1941 establishments in Sweden